Buttstädt is a former Verwaltungsgemeinschaft ("collective municipality") in the district of Sömmerda, in Thuringia, Germany. The seat of the Verwaltungsgemeinschaft was in Buttstädt. It was disbanded in January 2019.

The Verwaltungsgemeinschaft Buttstädt consisted of the following municipalities:
Buttstädt
Ellersleben 
Eßleben-Teutleben 
Großbrembach 
Guthmannshausen 
Hardisleben 
Kleinbrembach 
Mannstedt 
Olbersleben 
Rudersdorf

References

Former Verwaltungsgemeinschaften in Thuringia